Late Riser is the second studio album by American band Frances Cone. It was released in on January 17, 2019 through Living Daylights.

Track listing

References

2019 albums